The Battles of Bilohorivka are a pair of military engagements during the Russian invasion of Ukraine in 2022, as part of the Battle of Donbass wider offensive into eastern Ukraine. The first battle began on May 5th and ended with a Russian victory at Sieverodonetsk and Lysychansk on July 3, 2022. Russian forces used Bilohorivka as a springboard to launch attacks on Siversk and the surrounding area, but were stopped by Ukrainian forces in mid-summer. 

The second battle began after a series of Ukrainian victories in the Kharkiv counteroffensive. Ukrainian forces on September 19 drove Russian forces to the outskirts of Bilohorivka, where Russian troops dug in, creating a strong line of defense for the strategically important city of Lysychansk, which they took the same day as Bilohorivka. 

Bilohorivka is strategically important due to possible plans to launch an attack on Lysychansk.

Background 

On 24 February 2022, Russian forces and their separatist allies launched an offensive into Donbas.

On 18 April, Ukrainian and Russian authorities announced the beginning of the battle of Donbas, a large-scale push to capture all of Luhansk and Donetsk oblasts.The next day, Russian troops captured the town of Kreminna, consolidating their initial positions for a possible landing attack on Bilohorivka from the north across the Siverskyi Donets River.

Battle 

Between May 5 and 13, Russian forces began a series of military engagements known as the Battle of Siverskyi Donets on the Liman-Sierodonetsk front. It was part of a wider offensive against eastern Ukraine, in which the Russian side suffered a heavy defeat in Kharkiv Oblast during a Ukrainian counter-offensive.  However, after May 13, Russian troops exclusively focused on separate fighting points with the aim of capturing three towns where heavy fighting continued. The primary targets were Sievierodonetsk, Bilohorivka and Toshkivka.

First battle 
On 7 May 2022, a school in Bilohorivka, was bombed by Russian forces during the Battle of Sievierodonetsk. The death of at least two people was confirmed while authorities said the actual death toll was close to 60.

About ninety people were sheltering inside the building's basement at the time, which President Volodymyr Zelenskyy said was the majority of the village's population. The building was hit by a Russian airstrike, setting the building on fire and trapping large numbers of people inside. This attack started the first battle for Bilohorivka.

Penetration from the north

On 8 May, Russian forces constructed a pontoon bridge across the Donets at Bilohorivka. Thousands of personnel, tanks, and other military vehicles prepared to cross over to the west bank of the river as part of their wider advance westward towards Lyman. 

On the same day, the Ukrainian 17th Tank Brigade sent a reconnaissance detachment to the west bank of the river to observe Russian progress in the area. Russian troops had thrown smoke grenades in the area, impairing visibility. To counter this, the Ukrainian forces deployed drones, successfully spotting the pontoon bridge in the early morning. This information was relayed to the Ukrainian Air Force and artillery detachments stationed throughout the area, who pounded the bridge with a combined aerial and artillery bombardment. The bridge was confirmed destroyed by 10 May. Ukrainian infantry claimed 30 vehicles destroyed with another 40 disabled by artillery fire for 70 total at this crossing. Ukrainian forces blew up four separate bridges at Bilohorivka alone.

The last bridge was constructed between Bilohorivka and Serebrianka around 12 May and was also destroyed. The last Russian troops retreated to their side of the river on 13 May.

Penetration from the south and east
After the Russian defeat and failure to land at Bilohorivka from the north, the Russian side focused on the city of Lyman on the left side of the river while in the following weeks they pressed on Bilohorivka from the direction of Toshkivka from the south and east and the fighting in Sieverodonetsk and  Lysychansk, which they occupied in June. Ukrainian troops held a strong line of defense in the south until the fall of Lysychansk on July 3. The front collapsed then due to heavy Russian pressure from the east, causing Ukrainian forces to conduct a tactical withdrawal and form a new line about twenty kilometers west towards Siversk for the defense of that city.

Aftermath of first battle 

With the fall of Lysychansk and its western outskirts, Russia and the Luhansk People's Republic declared full control of Luhansk Oblast for the first time, achieving an objective of the Russian-led campaign. Bilohorivka became one of the last settlements in the Luhansk region to come under Russian control.

Operational pause and failure at Siversk
After the capture of Bilohorivka, Russian forces focused on taking control of the Donetsk People's Republic, primarily on ending the eight-year blockade of Donetsk and Horlivka and taking control of Bakhmut and Sloviansk. However, the Ukrainian forces carried out a massive mobilization in mid-summer and received significant amounts of modern military equipment and techniques from Western countries, while the Russian side significantly reduced their numbers and sent soldiers home on leave, which allowed the Ukrainians to stop further Russian advances west towards Siversk. The Russian Ministry of Defense announced on July 16 that the operational pause was effectively over. During the next month and a half only positional and trench battles took place on the Siversk-Bilohorivka route.

Eastern counter-offensive and  Ukrainian recapture of Bilohorivka
On September 9, Ukrainian troops liberated Sviatohirsk, which had fallen under Russian control at the beginning of June. They thus unblocked the city of Siversk, pushing Russian forces further towards Bilokhorivka. The following day, September 10,  Ukrainian forces retook control of some villages in Luhansk oblast, including Bilohorivka, from which Russian forces had expelled them at the beginning of July after the fall of Lysychansk. During the ten-day Ukrainian counter-offensive, on September 19, Russian troops were forced to leave Bilohorivka and form a line of defense on the outskirts of the city. The Ukrainian advance was stopped on the eastern outskirts of Bilohorivka, where they set up defensive positions. On 20 September 2022, Serhii Haidai, head of the Luhansk Regional Military Administration, said that "Bilohorivka was Ukraine’s last stronghold in Luhansk Oblast. It was the area of constant heavy fighting. Our defenders have squeezed the invaders out and are in full control of the town. However, it is still under artillery fire. The town no longer exists because the invaders razed it to the ground".

Second battle 

Russian troops continuously conducted artillery, air and infantry attacks on the town of Bilohorivka for months with the aim of recapturing it, but without much success, since very strong Ukrainian forces were dug in at that town. In the following months, Bilohorivka was the scene of heavy fighting, and the city's infrastructure, unlike in the first phase of the fighting in the summer, was completely destroyed.

Russian artillery and infantry attacks
On October 18, Russia attempted an assault with artillery support on Bilohorivka, Hrekivka, Nadia and Novoyehorivka, but the attack was repulsed. Russian troops continued to shell liberated settlements, turning them into "ashes." According to Luhansk Oblast Governor Serhii Khaidai, on October 18, Ukrainian forces repelled several Russian attacks, including one near the recently liberated village of Bilohorivka.

On October 24, Russian forces attempted a wider occupation in the area of Bilohorivka, but Ukrainian forces repelled the attacks.

Russian penetration into the city
The Ukrainian General Staff reported that Russian troops attacked Bilohorivka on November 6, but did not confirm Russian claims that their forces had entered the settlement. On November 7, Russian media claimed that Russian proxy troops, the 6th Cossack Regiment of the Lugansk People's Republic (LNR) and Wagner Group soldiers entered Bilohorivka (10 km south of Kreminna) after several months of heavy fighting along the borders of Donetsk and Luhansk oblasts and that fighting continued in residential areas of the settlement. The Ukrainian General Staff also noted that a Ukrainian strike damaged a unit of the Chechen Akhmat Battalion in Lysychansk, about 10 km east of Bilohorivka, on 7 November. 

Russian forces sought to regain their lost positions in that strategically important place, to push Ukrainian troops away from the critical area of Sievierodonetsk-Lysychansk (east) and Kreminna-Svatove (north) on which Ukrainian troops were exerting strong pressure from the Lyman and Kupiansk. Bilohorivka was also very important for Russian troops for a possible offensive towards Soledar and Bakhmut to the south, where Russian troops also focused on strong offensive actions. However, both Russian and Ukrainian media reported on November 9 that fighting continued in the neighborhoods of Bilohorivka and that fierce street fighting continued in the following weeks and months. On November 12, Russian troops attempted a wider infantry attack with artillery support in the area of Bilohorivka and Spirne, with the intention of encircling them, but Ukrainian forces repelled the attack and formed a defensive line from Bilohorivka to Spirne.

Ukrainian counteroffensive
On November 14, Ukrainian forces continued counter-offensives on the Svatove-Kremina line and expanded the counter-offensive in and around the town of Bilohorivka with the intention of pushing Russian forces further towards Lysychansk, 13km east. After fierce fighting, members of the Wagner group were driven out of Bilohorivka to the eastern outskirts of the city by evening. On November 16, the commander of BARS-13 (Russian Combat Reserve) stated that Ukrainian forces had launched a counteroffensive near the city of Kreminna and that counteroffensive operations had been extended 12 km south of Kreminna to Bilohorivka, since November 16. The goal of this counteroffensive operation was for Ukrainian forces to regain lost territories in Luhansk Oblast south of the Donets. Bilohorivka was strategically very important for the liberation of the city of Lysychansk as the counteroffensive in eastern Ukraine progressed. Powerful artillery attacks began with precision strikes from HIMARS multi-barrel rocket systems. By the morning of November 17, Ukrainian troops had driven out the Russian forces from the northern side of the city of Bilohorivka and extended the Svatove-Kremina-Bilohorivka-Spirne front line to the right of the Donets River. The Russians counterattacked, trying to regain the territory of the village, which was completely destroyed. Haydai stated that this operation was aimed at the return of occupied cities such as Sieverodonetsk, Rubizhne and Lysychansk because local residents were freezing and had to heat their apartments in high-rise buildings with firewood. The Ukrainian General Staff reported that Ukrainian forces repulsed Russian ground attacks in the northeast near Spirne and Bilohorivka, as Russian troops brought reinforcements from the direction of Lysychansk, which was seriously threatened. Deputy Interior Minister of the Luhansk People's Republic (LNR) Vitaly Kiselyov claimed that the forces of the Wagner Group repelled Ukrainian counterattacks towards Lysichansk and entrenched themselves in the eastern parts of Bilokhorivka. Between November 12 and 17, Bilohorivka was virtually destroyed in fierce fighting.

Positional battles east of the city November-December 2022
On December 8, Lugansk Oblast Governor Serhiy Haidai said Russia had deployed more troops near Lysychansk to try to capture the village of Bilohorivka and described an intensified Russian air offensive. In December, Russian forces brought reinforcements from the direction of Lysychansk and Popasna and attempted several more infantry attacks, but were repulsed.

Fall of Soledar and Russian offensive January—February 2023
After the fall of Soledar, Russian forces continued offensive operations at Bilohorivka on January 16. The Ukrainian General Staff reported that Ukrainian forces repulsed Russian attacks in the vicinity 24 km north of Soledar at Verkhnokamyanska, Spirne, Krasnopolivka, Sil and Bilohorivka. Geolocated imagery showed that Russian forces made minor progress north of Bilohorivka On January 25, Russian forces launched fiercer ground attacks to regain lost positions near Kreminna and eliminate the threat of a Ukrainian offensive from the south across the Donets River. The Ukrainian General Staff reported that Ukrainian forces repulsed a Russian attack near Bilohorivka,(12 km southeast of Kreminna), however the Russian Defense Ministry claimed that Russian forces pushed out Ukrainian sabotage and reconnaissance groups south of Kreminna and gained a foothold near the Siverskyi Donets. A member of the BARS announced  combat missions in the Kreminna area and claimed that they were under constant Ukrainian sniper fire. 

On January 29 and 30, Russian forces intensified ground attacks on Dibrova (5 km southwest of Kreminna) and Bilohorivka (12 km south of Kreminna) in the Luhansk region and Yampolivka (16 km west of Kreminna) from the north. On January 29, members of the 76th Guards Air Assault Division (Western Military District), the 4th LNR Territorial Defense Brigade and the 144th Motorized Division conducting offensive operations near Kreminna. On January 30, Russian forces made an indefinite advance in the Dibrova area and attacked in the direction of Yampolivka. Also on January 30, Ukrainian forces heavily shelled Russian targets west of Dibrova and succeeded in thwarting a marginal advance by Russian forces southwest of Kreminna. The spokesman for Ukraine's Eastern Group of Forces, Colonel Serhiy Cherevaty, said on January 31 that the Ukrainian advance on the Svatove-Kreminna line had slowed down due to Russian artillery pounding Ukrainian positions about 8 km west of Kreminna the previous day, indicating that Ukrainian forces advanced to 8 km from the settlement. The Russians fiercely pounded Bolohorivka with artillery, to which the Ukrainian forces responded with attacks on Russian-occupied areas. Russian media reported January 31, that according to the Luhansk People's Republic (LNR), Ukrainian troops attacked Kadiivka (48 km west of Luhansk city on the T0504 Lysichansk-Luhansk highway) using HIMARS.

On February 1, Russian forces launched a major counter-offensive on the Svatove-Kreminna line in the direction of Yampil and Lyman, which they had lost in the major Ukrainian Kharkiv counter-offensive in September and October 2022. In the first two days of February, Russian troops increased the number of attacks in the area of Bilohorivka settlement, to identify weak points in the defense of the Armed Forces of Ukraine. A video released on February 1 shows alleged Russian forces disguised as Ukrainian infantry attacking Ukrainian positions near Bilohorivka. The Ukrainian side accused Russia of violating the Geneva Convention on War Crimes, which prohibits "improper use of military insignia and uniforms of the enemy." On the morning of February 3, some Russian bloggers announced that Ukrainian forces had retreated from Bilohorivka towards Siversk, and some Telegram channels announced that Russian forces had entered Bilohorivka. The Ukrainian side denied those claims. On February 4, Russian forces captured most of the settlement, and some Russian milbloggers claimed that they were currently clearing it, while others claimed that Russian forces were still fighting to capture Bilohorivka. On 5 February, Ukrainian forces counterattacked and recaptured positions in Bilohorivka as of 6 February despite Russian claims that, Russian forces had captured Bilohorivka on 3 February. On February 6, Russian forces withdrew from most of Bilohorivka following a Ukrainian counterattack. Ukrainian forces regained control over a large part of Bilohorivka. Some Russian milbloggers claimed that Russian forces tried to advance again towards Siversk from the northeast near Bilohorivka, from the east near Zolotarivka, and from the southeast near Spirne. However, the plan was foiled on February 5 and 6, so the Russian troops continued their breakthrough from the south from the direction of Soledar, where Ukrainian forces were largely destroyed, and that Ukrainian forces tried to bring in reinforcements from Bilohorivka, which failed because the Russians tried to occupy it and to threaten Siversk from the east and Lyman from the south. On February 7, Russian forces withdrew from most of Bilohorivka following a Ukrainian counterattack. Ukrainian forces regained control over a large part of Bilohorivka. On February 8, Ukrainian forces continued counteroffensive operations south of Kremenje. The Ukrainian General Staff reported that Russian troops were attacked near Shepilov (7 km south of Kreminna) and Bilohorivka (10 km south of Kreminna). The following day, Ukrainian troops repulsed a Russian attack near Bilohorivka, and Russian troops began offensive operations north of Bilohorivka and along the Shepilovo-Dibrova line, about 5 km south of Kreminna. Over the next few weeks, heavy positional fighting continued within a few kilometers of Bilohorivka with constant and persistent Russian attacks to break through the renewed Ukrainian defense line, but to no avail.

See also
Battle of the Svatove–Kreminna line
List of military engagements during the 2022 Russian invasion of Ukraine
Timeline of the 2022 Russian invasion of Ukraine: phase 4

References 

Bilohorivka
Bilohorivka
May 2022 events in Ukraine
June 2022 events in Ukraine
July 2022 events in Ukraine
September 2022 events in Ukraine
October 2022 events in Ukraine
November 2022 events in Ukraine
December 2022 events in Ukraine
January 2023 events in Ukraine
History of Luhansk Oblast
Bilohorivka